My Aunt, Your Aunt is a 1939 German comedy film directed by Carl Boese and starring Ralph Arthur Roberts, Johannes Heesters, and Olly Holzmann. Boese later directed a 1956 film of the same title.

The film's sets were designed by the art director Ernst H. Albrecht.

Cast

References

Bibliography

External links 
 

1939 films
1939 comedy films
Films of Nazi Germany
German comedy films
1930s German-language films
Films directed by Carl Boese
UFA GmbH films
German black-and-white films
1930s German films